Dragodana is a commune in Dâmbovița County, Muntenia, Romania with a population of 6,755 people. It is composed of seven villages: Boboci, Burduca, Cuparu, Dragodana, Pădureni, Picior de Munte, and Străoști.

Situated in the central part of the Wallachian Plain, the commune lies on the banks of the river Sabar and is located in the central-south part of Dâmbovița County. Dragodana is crossed by national road , which runs from the town of Găești,  to the west, to the county seat, Târgoviște,  to the north, and on to Ploiești.

Natives
 Ion Niță (born 1948), footballer 
 Mariana Preda (born 1994), pan flute musician
 Niculae Zamfir (born 1958), wrestler

References

Communes in Dâmbovița County
Localities in Muntenia